Antonio Allen (born September 23, 1988) is a former American football free safety. Allen was drafted by the New York Jets in the seventh round, 242nd overall pick of the 2012 NFL Draft. He played college football at South Carolina.

Early years
Allen attended Trinity Catholic High School in Ocala, Florida. Allen earned first-team all-state honors after his senior season at Trinity Catholic.

College career
Allen the University of South Carolina from 2008 to 2011. He played linebacker his first two years before switching to safety. He finished his career with 198 tackles, 3.5 sacks, four interceptions and two touchdowns.

Professional career
Allen was considered one of the top safety prospects heading into the 2012 NFL Draft.

New York Jets
The New York Jets drafted Allen using their seventh round selection in the 2012 NFL Draft. Allen came to an agreement with the team on a four-year contract that included a $45,896 signing bonus. Allen was waived on September 1, 2012. He was re-signed to the team's practice squad a day later. Allen was promoted to the active roster on October 12, 2012 after the team placed Darrelle Revis on injured reserve. On November 6, 2012, he was waived after the team re-signed Jason Hill. He was signed to the practice squad two days later after clearing waivers. Allen was promoted to the active roster on December 6, 2012.

Allen entered the 2013 preseason competing with newly signed Jaiquawn Jarrett for the starting free safety job. Allen finished the 2013 season with 60 tackles, a sack, and an interception for a touchdown.

Allen was waived by the Jets on August 7, 2015 after suffering an Achilles tendon injury. After clearing waivers, he was placed on injured reserve on August 10, 2015.

Houston Texans
Allen signed with the Houston Texans on March 16, 2016. On September 3, 2016, he was released by the Texans.

Second stint with New York Jets
On September 6, 2016, Allen re-signed with the New York Jets. He was waived/injured on December 10, 2016 and placed on injured reserve.

References

External links
South Carolina Gamecocks bio
New York Jets bio

1988 births
Living people
African-American players of American football
American football cornerbacks
American football safeties
American football linebackers
Sportspeople from Ocala, Florida
South Carolina Gamecocks football players
New York Jets players
Houston Texans players
21st-century African-American sportspeople
20th-century African-American people